This is a list of United States armed forces general officers and flag officers who were killed in World War II. The dates of death listed are from the attack on Pearl Harbor on 7 December 1941 to the surrender of Japan on 2 September 1945, when the United States was officially involved in World War II. Included are generals and admirals who were killed by friendly or hostile fire, suicide or accidents (usually airplane crashes). General and flag officers who died of illness or natural causes are not included. The rank listed was at the time of their death.

In 1954, the United States Congress passed Public Law 83-508, which promoted lieutenant generals who had commanded an army or Army Ground Forces during World War II to the rank of general. When it took effect on 19 July 1954, Simon Bolivar Buckner Jr. and Lesley J. McNair were posthumously promoted. One officer was posthumously promoted to general officer rank during the war: Colonel William O. Darby, whose nomination for promotion to the rank of brigadier general had already been approved by Congress and submitted to President Harry S. Truman for approval at the time of his death. On the other hand, Douglas B. Netherwood was promoted to brigadier general in October 1940, but reverted to the rank of colonel on 25 December 1941. He died in an air crash on 19 August 1943.

Lieutenant generals

Major generals

Rear admirals

Brigadier generals

Commodores

Colonels

Brigadier generals of the Philippine Army
The Commonwealth of the Philippines was a U.S. territory during World War II, and Filipinos were United States nationals. The Philippine Army was created in 1935 to prepare the Philippines to become independent in 1946 with its own independent military. Many U.S. military officers became officers in the new Philippine Army, the most famous amongst them being Field Marshal of the Philippine Army Douglas MacArthur. Because the Philippines was a part of the United States and the Philippine Army was, on President Franklin D. Roosevelt's orders, part of the United States Army Forces in the Far East and later part of the U.S. military in the South West Pacific Area, four Philippine Army general officers (all of whom held the rank of brigadier general) who were killed during World War II are listed here. Two Filipino graduates of West Point, Vicente Lim and Fidel Segundo, were killed in action during World War II while serving as generals for the Philippines and the United States. All served in the United States Army during their careers before being promoted to brigadier general in the Philippine Army.

Notes

References

 
 
 
 
 
 

Officers killed in World War II
US Killed in World War II
US Killed in World War II
Lists of people killed in World War II
Officers killed in World War II